Leonteq AG is a Swiss company founded in 2007 and headquartered in Zurich. It is specialized in structured financial products and in insurance products in the sector of finance and technology. It is an issuer of its own products, as well as a partner of other finance companies.

Leonteq has subsidiaries in 10 countries and serves more than 50 markets. Leonteq AG is listed on SIX Swiss Exchange and forms part of the SPI.
The company is a member of the Swiss Structured Products Association (SVSP).

History
Founded in November 2007 as EFG Financial Products Holding AG, company's shares were publicly listed in October 2012. In 2013 the company was renamed to Leonteq AG.

Products and services
Leonteq's structured products comprise mostly capital protection, return optimization and participation. Leonteq's insurance products support life insurance providers in the design of retirement plans with guarantees.

Financial information
In the year 2018, the company had 486 full-time equivalents, a transaction volume of 28.8 billion CHF and had an operational profit of 282.4 million CHF.

References

Investment companies of Switzerland
Financial services companies of Switzerland
Companies listed on the SIX Swiss Exchange